Anderson Chapel, also known as St. Paul's Episcopal Chapel, is a historic Episcopal church located at Swanton, Garrett County, Maryland.  It is a late-19th century frame, one-story, gable-roofed church built in the Carpenter Gothic board-and-batten style. This style was popularized by the architect Richard Upjohn during the 19th century.

It was listed on the National Register of Historic Places in 1984.

References

External links
, including photo from 1981, at Maryland Historical Trust

Churches on the National Register of Historic Places in Maryland
Churches completed in 1882
19th-century Episcopal church buildings
Episcopal church buildings in Maryland
Carpenter Gothic church buildings in Maryland
Churches in Garrett County, Maryland
National Register of Historic Places in Garrett County, Maryland
1882 establishments in Maryland